Jeffrey Hopkins (born 14 April 1964) is a former Welsh international football defender and current Melbourne Victory Women head coach, who most notably played club football for Fulham and Reading in the Football League.

Club career
Hopkins started his career as a trainee with Fulham, going on to make over 200 first team appearances for the club. This was followed by a four-year spell at Crystal Palace, including a loan to Plymouth Argyle in 1991–92. He spent a few months at Bristol Rovers in 1992, before spending the remaining five years of his Football League career with Reading.

While at Reading, he was part of the team that narrowly missed out on promotion to the Premier League in the 1994–95 season, losing 4–3 after extra time in the playoff final against Bolton Wanderers.

After a move to Malaysian football with Selangor where he was made captain, Hopkins moved to Australia in October 1999 as a player-coach with Gippsland Falcons in the National Soccer League.

International career
Hopkins made his debut for the Wales national under-21 football team during the 1981/82 season against France. He made a total of 5 under-21 appearances during that season and the next.

He made his debut for the senior Welsh team on 31 May 1983 against Northern Ireland, and he made 16 appearances for Wales over the next seven years, with his final game coming against Costa Rica on 20 May 1990.

Management
Hopkins was named player-manager of the Gippsland Falcons in the lead-up to the 1999-2000 National Soccer League Season after the departure of Stuart Munro to rivals Carlton SC. Hopkins became full-time manager during the season and retired from playing. He departed when the club exited the National Soccer League at the end of the 2000-2001 National Soccer League Season.

Hopkins was coach of the Brisbane Roar women's team from their inaugural season in 2008, in which he led the team to a championship-premiership double. On 15 June 2012 it was announced he had been appointed as senior first team Assistant manager. On 30 April 2013, at the end of Brisbane Roar's 2012–13 A-League season, the Roar announced that he would become the Brisbane Roar Youth coach for the 2013–14 A-League National Youth League season. On 26 November 2014, following the resignation of Ron Smith, Hopkins moved into the role of assistant coach of Brisbane Roar.
On 17 June 2016, Hopkins was appointed head coach of the Melbourne Victory women's team.

References

Living people
1964 births
Footballers from Swansea
Welsh footballers
Wales youth international footballers
Wales under-21 international footballers
Wales international footballers
Association football defenders
Bristol Rovers F.C. players
Crystal Palace F.C. players
Fulham F.C. players
Gippsland Falcons players
Plymouth Argyle F.C. players
Reading F.C. players
English Football League players
National Soccer League (Australia) players
Selangor FA players